The women's speed relay event at the 2018 Asian Games took place on 27 August at Jakabaring Sport City, Palembang, Indonesia.

Schedule
All times are Western Indonesia Time (UTC+07:00)

Results 
Legend
FS — False start

Qualification

Knockout round

References

External links
Official website

Sport climbing at the 2018 Asian Games